BBC Asian Network is a British Asian radio station owned and operated by the BBC. The station's target audience is people "with an interest in British Asian lifestyles", especially British Asians between the ages of 18 and 34. The station has production centres at Broadcasting House in London and The Mailbox in Birmingham.

The station broadcasts mainly in English, but has retained Sunday evening shows in South Asian languages. The Asian Network covers only the Indian subcontinent, with the rest of the continent – such as Japan and China – not covered by the station.

The station's output consists largely of music and talk programmes. On Fridays at 4:00 p.m., the station broadcasts The Official Asian Music Chart, compiled by the Official Charts Company and based on sales and streams across a seven-day period.

According to RAJAR, the station broadcasts to a weekly audience of 460,000 with a listening share of 0.3% as of December 2022.

History

Origins as a regional programme/station
By 1949, the BBC had introduced their first weekly Bengali language programme, Anjuman, through the efforts of Nazir Ahmed and Nurul Momen. Momen also conducted a children's programme titled Kakoli. The BBC was later joined by more Bengalis such as Fateh Lohani and Fazle Lohani. BBC television had also broadcast an Asian news programme, Nai Zindagi Naya Jeevan, since 1968 from its studios in Birmingham; this series followed a traditional news and current affairs format.

In 1976 BBC Radio Leicester, responding to the growth of the size of the South Asian population and rising racial tension in Leicester, introduced a daily community show called Six Fifteen, aimed primarily at that community in the city. By 1977, CRE research showed that the programme regularly reached 67% of the South Asian community in Leicester. BBC Radio Leicester dominated the provision of Asian programming on BBC local radio and by 1990 was producing one third of the output. In 1989, BBC WM, the BBC radio station for the Midlands, followed Radio Leicester's lead and introduced a similar daily show as part of a new Midlands Asian Network.

On 30 October 1989, The Asian Network was launched on the MW transmitters of BBC WM and BBC Radio Leicester, with a combined output of 57 hours per week. This was extended to 86 hours a week in 1995 and on 4 November 1996 the station became a full-time service, on air for eighteen hours a day in Leicester and Birmingham, and was relaunched as the BBC Asian Network with programming also broadcast on the MW transmitters of stations with large Asian communities (with the exception of BBC GLR which was an FM-only station).

Station goes national

In November 1999, as part of the addition of a suite of BBC and commercial radio services to the Sky Digital satellite television platform, BBC Asian Network was made available to Sky viewers alongside BBC Radio 1, BBC Radio 2, BBC Radio 3, BBC Radio 4, BBC Radio 5 Live, BBC World Service, BBC Radio Scotland, BBC Radio Wales and BBC Radio Ulster.

On Monday 28 October 2002, it was relaunched for the DAB Digital Radio system, now broadcasting nationwide.

In January 2006, the BBC announced that they were investing an extra £1m in the BBC Asian Network, and increasing the number of full-time staff by 30% in a bid to make British South Asian interests "a mainstream part of the corporation's output".

2006 branding and schedule changes
In April 2006, the first wave of schedule changes were introduced with further changes coming into effect on 14 May and 21 May, with weekend changes occurring from 17 June. In August 2007, the Asian Network received a new logo as part of a general re-brand of all national BBC stations. In 2009, this was re-branded again to add prominence to the Asian aspect of the logo.

Drama output until 2010
One of the most significant programmes in the Asian Network line-up was an ongoing Asian soap opera Silver Street, which was first broadcast in 2004. Storylines focused on the lives of a British South Asian community in an unnamed English town, with themes that generally related to issues that affect the daily lives of British South Asians and their neighbours.

Following the reduction of episode lengths to five minutes per day and continued falling listenership, on 16 November 2009 the BBC announced they would be cancelling Silver Street. The last episode was broadcast in March 2010. The cancellation grew out of many criticisms of the Asian Network in the BBC Trust's Annual Report.

Silver Street was replaced by monthly half-hour dramas and in August 2010, BBC Asian Network announced it would be launching a new drama season from 1 September 2010.

2020s
In March 2022, BBC Introducing on Asian Network with Jasmine Takhar was nominated for Best Radio Show at the Music Week Awards. The show is the first from the Asian Network to be nominated by the Music Week Awards.

In February 2023, the Asian Network breakfast show with Nikita Kanda went on a three city tour marking the first tour by the network. The cities included Liverpool, Manchester and Glasgow.

In March 2023, BBC Introducing on Asian Network with Jasmine Takhar was nominated for Best Radio Show at the Music Week Awards for the second year running. The show also celebrated International Women’s Day by selecting 4 female talent for a live session at the world famous Maida Vale studios hosted by Jasmine Takhar. The talent include SHVVN, Nova, Saloni and Diana Drill.

Love Island season 9 winners Sanam and Kai co-hosted the Asian Network breakfast show with Nikita Kanda.

Threat of closure, performance and controversies

Threat of closure
On 26 February 2010 The Times reported that Mark Thompson, Director General of the BBC, proposed closing the station in a bid to scale back BBC operations and allow commercial rivals more room. The proposal of closure – along with BBC Radio 6 Music – was later confirmed on 2 March.

A letter was written to the BBC Trust and signed by various people – although the actual number of signatories was artificially boosted with many signing their name more than once (as both a single name and as part of different collectives).

On the official Asian Network message boards, listeners advocated keeping their station at the expense of 6 Music, although the BBC Trust later rejected plans to close 6 Music and also rejected the plans to close the Asian Network.

On 14 March 2011, the BBC announced it was reconsidering its plan to close the station in favour of reducing its budget by 50%.

Sliding audiences and increasing costs

In July 2009 it was revealed that the Asian Network had lost over 20% of its listeners in a single year and, per listener, was the most costly and expensive BBC radio station to operate.

In 2011, the BBC ruled there would be a 46% reduction in the Asian Network's budget and a declared target of 600,000 listeners a week; with actual audience numbers only peaking at 507,000. In 2012, audience numbers fell even further; peaking at only 453,000. Even with the budget reductions, in 2013 the Asian Network had the largest budget of the BBC's digital-only radio stations at £13m; despite having the lowest audience figures by far.

RAJAR's figures in 2014 showed that the Asian Network had at last briefly met the target set four years earlier, finally peaking at 619,000 listeners in Q4. However, the Asian Network was noted as being the BBC's only station – across both television and radio – whose Appreciation Index measurably fell in 2014.

By May 2015, the Asian Network had once again lost a substantial number of listeners, with the RAJAR reporting a peak of just 562,000 listeners – a loss of 57,000 from the previous quarter.

In 2016–17, the Asian Network had the second highest cost-per-user of all the BBC's radio stations, at 3.4p per hour, the second highest budget of the BBC's digital-only radio stations at £7.5m and by far the lowest audience figures of all the BBC's stations.

In 2017/18, it was noted the station not only remained as having the highest cost-per-user of all the BBC radio output, but whose costs also increased – rising from 3.4p per hour the previous year to 3.7p per hour. The audience Appreciation Index figure did not increase, remaining at 80.3; and the average length of time spent on the channel dramatically fell from 06:11 to 05:19 – the biggest fall of all of the BBC's radio stations.

In 2018/19, the Asian Network's annual budget increased from £7m to £8m, but the station continued to perform poorly: population reach was down again to 1.1%, time spent on the channel per week fell again to 5:12 and an increase in cost per user per hour (up to 5p).

The station's poor performance continued into 2019/20, where it was noted time spent on the channel fell dramatically again by 20% to just 4:07, while the cost per use per hour had increased up to 6p, remaining the BBC's most expensive-per-listener station. Peak audience figures plunged down to 519,000 listeners, losing 13.8% and in 2021/22, the stations audience reach fell to just 1% – the station continues to have by far the lowest audience figures and highest cost-per-user figures of all the BBC's stations.

Rotherham sex abuse scandal controversy 
In 2018, the station's Head of News Arif Ansari was charged under the Sexual Offences (Amendment) Act 1992 after a reporter named a victim of the Rotherham child sexual exploitation scandal during a live news bulletin. In January 2019, he was cleared when a judge ruled that Ansari was not at fault and had been incorrectly told the name of the victim was a pseudonym. He was the first BBC editor to be tried under the legislation.

Notable presenters

Jassa Ahluwalia
Nadia Ali
Bobby Friction 
Panjabi Hit Squad
Nayha
Nikita Kanda
Mistah Islah
Jasmine Takhar
Noreen Khan
Islah Abdur-Rahman

Former presenters

Yasser
Aasmah Mir
Adil Ray
Ameet Chana
Anita Rani
Harpz Kaur
DJ Kayper
Nikki Bedi
Pathaan
Murtz
Nerm
Sonia Deol
Tommy Sandhu
Nihal Arthanayake
Rozina Sini
Sunny and Shay
Preeya Kalidas
Raj and Pablo
Ashanti Omkar

References

External links

 Origins of BBC Asian Network
 BBC Asian Network relaunched on DAB at bbc.co.uk

 
Asian Network
Asian mass media in the United Kingdom
Asian-British culture
British Indian mass media
British Pakistani mass media
British Bangladeshi mass media
World music radio stations
Radio stations established in 1988
1988 establishments in the United Kingdom
Radio stations in the United Kingdom